Mint poison dart frog may refer to:
Green and black poison dart frog (Dendrobates auratus) or mint poison frog, a medium-sized poison dart frog from Central and South America
Golden poison frog (Phyllobates terribilis), especially the mint green morph, a large-sized poison dart frog endemic to Colombia

Animal common name disambiguation pages